Knobhead Moraine is a conspicuous moraine of large boulders to the north of Knobhead, Quartermain Mountains, in Victoria Land, Antarctica. It continues northward between the Cavendish Rocks and the western end of the Kukri Hills as a medial moraine in lower Taylor Glacier. The moraine was first observed by Lieutenant Albert B. Armitage, Royal Naval Reserve, second in command of the British National Antarctic Expedition, 1901–04, who named it in association with Knobhead.

References

Moraines of the Ross Dependency
Landforms of Victoria Land
McMurdo Dry Valleys